Southward Ho is a 1939 American Western film directed by Joseph Kane and starring Roy Rogers.

Plot
Towards the end of the War Between the States, Roy and Gabby are two Confederate cavalrymen who lure away a Union Army cavalry patrol in order to steal a cooked chicken and Union Colonel Denbigh's trousers.

Following the war the three meet again in Texas when the Colonel and Gabby are co-owners in a ranch. The Colonel is called back into service as a Military Governor to enforce the Reconstruction Acts against the former Confederates of the State. The cavalrymen assigned to the Colonel are all military criminals who use the opportunity to loot and terrorise the people for their own benefit. Roy attempts to convince the Colonel his men are acting unfairly. The Colonel's response is to remove the right of firearm ownership from the Texans with his men confiscating their weapons. The Colonel's men murder the Colonel and further attempt to tyrannise the population until Roy is able to get the population's firearms back.

Cast 
Roy Rogers as Roy
Lynne Roberts as Ellen Denbigh
George 'Gabby' Hayes as Gabby Whitaker
Wade Boteler as Colonel Denbigh
Arthur Loft as Captain Jeffries
Lane Chandler as Jim Crawford
Tom London as Union sergeant
Charles R. Moore as Skeeter
Ed Brady as Mears

Home media
On August 25, 2009, Alpha Video released Southward Ho on Region 0 DVD.

References

External links 
 
 

1939 films
1939 Western (genre) films
American Civil War films
American Western (genre) films
American black-and-white films
Films set in Texas
Republic Pictures films
Films directed by Joseph Kane
1930s English-language films
1930s American films